Monopotassium phosphite is an inorganic compound with the formula KH2PO3. A compositionally related compound has the formula H3PO3.2(KH2PO3). Both are white solids that consist of salts of the phosphite anion H2PO3−, the conjugate base of phosphorous acid.

Phosphites of potassium are used as fungicides (in a loose sense) in agriculture to combat water mold infection. Confusingly, they have also been marketed as fertilizers to avoid a regulatory burden. While perfectly capable to supply potassium to the plant, the phosphorus in phosphite form is unavailable to plants, and may even inhibit the uptake of the normal phosphate form if used in excess.

References 

Phosphites
Potassium compounds